The Bat! is an email client for the Microsoft Windows operating system, developed by Ritlabs, SRL, a company based in Chişinău, Moldova. There are two versions: a Home version and a Professional version. The Professional version includes a portable module, The Bat Voyager.

Reviews
Reviews indicate that The Bat! has been regarded as an alternative email client for email users who seek a strong emphasis on security, as well as having many customization and filtering options, yet has also been criticized for its complexity and difficulty in learning. 
This Bat really flies (May 2000) Review by TechByter.com
The Bat! 2.0 (February 2004) Review by PCMag.com
The Bat! Best Email Client (May 2005) Review by DonationCoder.com
The Bat! 3.6 Professional review (February 2006) Review by alphr.com
The Bat! 4.0.34 - Spooky Good E-mail Client (October 2008) Review by Brighthub.com
The Bat! Professional Review (February 2006) Review by Softpedia.com
The Bat Professional Is Not an Easier Email Client (July 2012) Review by PCWorld.com
The Bat! Pro Review (March 2016) Review by Filecritic.com
What is The Bat! email Client? (September 2016) Review by TechNews
The Bat! Review (February 2018) Review by VPNCrew.com
The Bat Review (May 2018) Review by Pandia.com
Best Email Clients for Windows (March 2019) Review by Zapier.com
The Bat! Email Client (June 2019) Review by Gadgetspeak.com
6 Best Email Clients for Windows 10 (November 2020) Review by TechGrinch.com
The Bat! 9.4.4 (August 2021) Review by Maddownload.com
The Bat! 9.4.4 (August 2021) Review by DownloadCrew.com

Features

Message Protocol
The Bat! supports POP3, IMAP, and Microsoft Exchange Server email.

Message Management
The Bat! provides virtual folders, advanced filtering, extensive search, a macro language, templates, tags, and color groups to assist in managing email.

Themes and Customization
In November 2020, with release of version 9.3 The Bat! introduced a number of themes to change its look and feel, also providing the ability for further color changes to the themes as provided. Toolbars and menus may also be modified, although doing that is difficult and not well documented.

Data security
Encryption. The internal PGP implementation based on OpenSSL lets users encrypt messages and sign them with digital signatures. Digital keys manager is included. PGP up to version 10.0.2 is supported. The Bat! supports S/MIME via Internal Implementation or Microsoft CryptoAPI, Secure Socket Layer (SSL) v3.0 / Transport Layer Security (TLS) v1.0, v1.1, and 1.2 (as of version 8.5) with AES algorithm.
Internal HTML Viewer. The Bat!’s internal viewer was replaced in version 9.2.1 with the Chromium web browser rendering engine to ensure HTML formatting is properly rendered, prevent script execution, and provide anti-phishing information.
Safe handling of attached files. The Bat! checks attached file extensions and blocks their launching if they are suspicious. The Bat! warns users of double extension attachments and allows users to see the real extension.
Selective download. Messages can be deleted or left on POP3 servers by setting up respective filters in the Sorting Office.
OAuth 2.0 Support. The Bat! v9.2.3 is in compliance with the Google's security standards related to the OAuth 2.0 protocol for authentication with Gmail, Outlook and Yandex. Version 9.3.2 extended support to Office365.com and Live.com
TLS AEAD AES-GCM cipher suites support. The Bat! v9.1 supports TLS AEAD AES-GCM cipher suites for secure connections with mail servers.

Productivity
Sorting Office. A filtering system that sorts incoming, outgoing, read, and replied messages to folders; auto-responds; replies with custom templates; forwards, redirects, prints, or exports messages; sends read confirmations; runs external programs and more.
Message Templates and Macros. Email templates contents may be dynamically changed through the use of macros, which can also be used to automatically execute other user-defined functions such as cursor positioning, addressing changes, identity changes, active account changes and other. 
Microsoft Exchange Connectivity. The Bat! connects to Microsoft Exchange Server using native MAPI protocol to fetch or send messages.
Multilingual Interface. Support for 18 languages. 
IDN support. Support for IDNs that contain characters from non-Latin alphabets such as Arabic, Chinese, Cyrillic and Greek. IDN support includes Latin alphabet-based characters with diacritics, such as those found in French and German.

History
1.0 Beta, the first public version, was released in March 1997. It supported folders, filtering, viewing HTML email without the need to have Internet Explorer installed, and international character sets. It also had a special feature named MailTicker.
1.00 Build 1310, the first stable version, came to public in March 1998.
1.32 introduced a proprietary layout engine on 27 April 2000. Versions up to 1.31 was used the THtmlViewer engine by David Baldwin.
Version 2.0 (September 2003) introduced IMAP support, a basic HTML editor, Anti-Spam and Anti-Virus Plug-ins and a Scheduler, and could import messages from Microsoft Office Outlook and Outlook Express
Features and changes for version 2.1 to the present version may be viewed at

System requirements
Compatible with Microsoft Windows XP and later versions. No minimum requirements for memory size or CPU speed. Runs on any Windows PC platform with at least 1024x768 screen resolution, and on Windows tablets.

See also
 Comparison of email clients
 Comparison of feed aggregators

References

External links
 

Windows email clients
Windows-only software
Shareware
Portable software
1997 software